Type 3 diabetes is a proposed term to describe the interlinked association between type 1 and type 2 diabetes, and Alzheimer's disease. This term is used to look into potential triggers of Alzheimer's disease in people with diabetes.

The proposed progression from diabetes to Alzheimer's disease is inadequately understood; however there are a number of hypotheses describing potential links between the two diseases. The internal mechanism of Insulin resistance and other metabolic risk factors such as hyperglycaemia, caused by oxidative stress and lipid peroxidation are common processes thought to be contributors to the development of Alzheimer's disease in diabetics.

Diagnosis for this disease is different between patients with type 1 and type 2 diabetes. Type 1 diabetes is usually discovered in children and adolescence while type 2 diabetic patients are often diagnosed later in life. While Type 3 diabetes is not a diagnosis in itself, a diagnosis of suspected Alzheimer's disease can be established through observational signs and sometimes with neuroimaging techniques such as Magnetic Resonance Imaging (MRI) to observe abnormalities in diabetic patient's brain tissue.

The techniques used to prevent the disease in patients with diabetes are similar to individuals who do not show signs of the disease. The four pillars of Alzheimer's disease prevention is currently used as a guide for individuals of who are at risk of developing Alzheimer's disease.

Research into the effectiveness of Glucagon-like Peptide 1 and Melatonin administration to manage the progression of Alzheimer's disease in diabetic patients is currently being conducted to decrease the rate at which Alzheimer's disease progresses.

Labelling Alzheimer's disease as Type 3 Diabetes is generally controversial, and this definition is not a known medical diagnosis. While insulin resistance is a risk factor for the development of Alzheimer's disease and some other dementias, causes of Alzheimer's disease are likely to be much more complex than being explained by insulin factors on their own, and indeed several patients with Alzheimer's disease have normal insulin metabolism.

Signs and symptoms 

Over time an individual will show a progressive pattern of cognitive impairment and decline.

The progression of this disease varies from person to person. It's the prevalence of symptoms is dependent on when the individual is diagnosed with diabetes. Individuals with type 1 diabetes are often diagnosed at a young age, usually between childhood and adolescence. In some cases, brain development in these patients is negatively impacted, therefore showing symptoms of the disease earlier in life. Symptoms of type 2 diabetes is characteristically seen in patients in their mid-sixties, leading to the prevalence of symptoms later in life. The early stages of the disease are often associated with memory loss however other areas such as loss in judgment and reasoning and spatial and visual issues are often early symptoms of the disease. As the individual ages, symptoms characteristically progress to more severe memory loss, poor judgement in making decisions, mood swings and in some cases patients are more susceptible to anxiety and/ or depression. In the final cases of the disease, severe and more prominent symptoms are shown. In these cases the individual has completely lost their independence and will be reliant on others as their body begins to fail.  Inability to communicate, Seizures, weight loss and loss of bowel control are the final symptoms.  However, in most cases, aspiration pneumonia, ulcers or untreated infections are the cause of death for these patients.

Cause 

There are a number of mechanisms that attempt to explain the cause, progression and the link between type 1 diabetes, type 2 diabetes and Alzheimer's disease.

Insulin resistance 
Insulin resistance reduces the body's sensitivity to insulin. This is a sign an individual has prediabetes or has progressed to develop type 2 diabetes. The result is high glucose levels in the blood which leave the individual feeling tired and weak in most cases. type 3 diabetes is a condition which can follow after initially being diagnosed with type 2 diabetes. In type 3 diabetes, the neurons lack glucose, a key element needed for the neurons to function effectively in body however more specifically the hippocampus and the cerebral cortex. This deficiency can lead to a decrease in memory, judgement and the ability to reason, of which are key symptoms of Alzheimer's disease.

Elevated Cholesterol
High levels of cholesterol and saturated fat control both the production of amyloid proteins in the brain and insulin release. In the brain, the more cholesterol the more amyloid that is produced and this generates plaques. The amyloid proteins are thought to be part of AD disease progression. Cholesterol is high in AD patients and a variant of the cholesterol transport protein apoE is the most common genetic risk factor for AD. Cholesterol is also a causative risk factor for diabetes. High levels of saturated fat and cholesterol induce metabolic syndrome and reduce insulin release.

In the brain, cholesterol is made in specialized helper cells called astrocytes and then shipped to the neurons where amyloid is made by substrate presentation. Brain cholesterol is thought to be maintained separate from the periphery in healthy individuals, so high cholesterol in the blood may not always correlate with high cholesterol in the brain. Cholesterol in the periphery is made in the liver and obtained from diet. Mouse models for type two diabetes are typically generated by feeding a mouse a high fat diet of cholesterol and saturated fat.

Hyperglycemia caused by oxidative stress 
The consumption of refined or simple carbohydrates (not complex carbohydrates), fatty (saturated) acids, small antioxidant consumption and little exercise are diabetic factors that contribute to oxidative stress within the brain. Oxidative stress is an imbalance of free radicals such as superoxide, hydroxyl radical and nitric oxide radical which can create damage to the cells and tissue in the body. This resulting imbalance leads to a slow decrease in cognition which can be severe in patients in type 2 diabetes.

Lipid peroxidation 
Type 2 diabetes causes change in patient's blood profile which increases the likelihood of the patient's cells to experience damage through lipid peroxidation. Lipid peroxidation involves free radicals taking electrons from lipids in the cell membrane, causing cell destruction. This process has been observed in patients with Alzheimer's disease. One of the main biomarkers of oxidative stress is lipid peroxidation as acids including polyunsaturated fatty acids are known to characteristically associate with free radicals. Therefore lipid peroxidation can cause enhancements in oxidative stress, a main process in type 2 diabetes and Alzheimer's disease.

Diagnosis 

A minor to medium decline in cognitive function is found to be linked with both type 1 diabetes and type 2 diabetes. However there are substantial variances in the cognitive pathophysiology of both type 1 diabetes and type 2 diabetes, leading to impairment. Type 2 diabetes is characteristically diagnosed from within the late fifties to mid-sixties age range however it is possible to be diagnosed younger.  This form of diabetes is typically related to insulin resistance, dyslipidemia, hypertension and obesity. These mechanisms have a harmful influence on brain development.

Type 1 diabetes is typically detected at a from a young age and may have negative impacts on cognitive growth. In both forms of diabetes, microvascular complications and hyperglycaemia are mutual risk factors that are found to contribute to the cognitive decline in patients.

Prevention 
There is no evidence today supporting a definitive method for preventing the onset of Alzheimer's disease in diabetic patients. However the four pillars of Alzheimer's prevention which outlines diet, physical and mental exercise, yoga and meditation and psychological well-being is recommended to patients who are at risk.

Diet 

Mediterranean diet, a diet based around fruit, vegetables, olive oil, nuts and seafood has been shown to lower the risks of Alzheimer's disease in patients. Specifically, patients who followed this diet which is modeled on particular Mediterranean nations presented decreasing amounts of amyloid-beta plaques between their nerve cells in the brain, signifying the cell connections within the brain were firing correctly. This diet also presented increases in the thickness in the memory division of the brain cortex in the formal and parietal lobes and areas of cognition such as language and memory. Updated versions of the Mediterranean diet such as the DASH diet have been recommended for patients, adding juicing and supplements to the recommendation for patients.

Physical and mental exercise 

Physical exercise increases the amount of blood flow through the brain while simultaneously causing the growth of brain cells known as neurogenesis. One hundred and twenty minutes of aerobic exercise and multiple strength sessions a week are suggested to maintain and increase memory function in the patient. Mental stimulation is also recommended for patients. Brain aerobic activities such as reading and puzzles are endorsed to test and stimulate cognitive functioning while creative activities like painting and viewing art also activate the conditioning of the brain.

Yoga and meditation 
Mediation and yoga have been found to reduce stress, which is major element in the cause of Alzheimer's disease. Stress has a negative impact on a patient's genes such as producing inflammation in the brain, a key component of Alzheimer's disease. Simple twelve minute meditation each day reduces levels of stress in patients and extends the flow of blood to key areas of the brain responsible for memory performance. Yoga also stimulates the Anterior Cingulate Gyrus,  a key area in the brain which manages memory recall, stress, emotive and cognitive stability.

Psychological well-being 
Psychological well-being factors such as self-acceptance and confidence, personal growth, regular socialization and independence decrease the probability of mental decline and reduce inflammation within the brain. Purpose in Life is now considered to increase the physiological health of patients with Alzheimer's disease. Optimistic emotions such as love, appreciation and kindness are known to lessen the stress response and maintain a healthy cognition throughout the rest of the patient's life.

Management

Melatonin administration 

Melatonin is discharged by the pineal gland as a neurohormone. Melatonin is a central hormone in the treatment of patients with Alzheimer's disease as it adjusts sleep patterns that are abnormal, which occurs in over forty five percent of patients. Melatonin affects type 3 diabetes by reducing harm caused by beta amyloid, regulating hyperglycaemia and insulin resistance in patients with diabetes and stopping blood-brain barrier disruption caused by hyperglycaemia. Through these processes, melatonin has been shown to lessen the progression of type 3 diabetes.

Glucagon-like Peptide 1 administration 
The administration of the hormone Glucagon-like Peptide 1 has shown to control the deregulation of glucose metabolism in patients with Alzheimer's disease. This hormone can recover cerebral dysfunction in diabetes induced Alzheimer's disease. The hormone Glucagon-like Peptide 1 can lessen the brain's inflamed reaction caused by amyloid beta oxidative stress. Glucagon-like Peptide 1 can also increase the rate of neurogenesis within the brains of Alzheimer's patients.  Glucagon-like Peptide 1 has the possibility to increase the production of neurons to substitute impaired neurons within the brain. This hormone can also decrease the brain's insulin resistance in Alzheimer's patients.

References 

Alzheimer's disease
Diabetes